Kinson is an electoral ward in Bournemouth, Dorset, England. Since 2019, the ward has elected 3 councillors to Bournemouth, Christchurch and Poole Council.

History 
The Kinson area was formerly part of two wards on Bournemouth Borough Council; Kinson North and Kinson South.

Kinson has elected councillors from Labour and the Liberal Democrats since 1999, but elected 3 Conservatives in 2019.

In 2021, former Kinson North councillor David Turtle was jailed for the murder of his wife.

Geography 
The Kinson ward covers the suburb of Kinson, as well as the areas of West Howe and Turbary Park, as well as parts of East Howe.

Councillors

Election results

References 

Wards of Bournemouth, Christchurch and Poole